The coinage in the Kingdom of Hungary (the minting and use of coins) started during the reign of Stephen I who was crowned the first king of Hungary in 1000 or 1001.

The minting of coins was from the beginning a royal prerogative in the Kingdom of Hungary. The first Hungarian coins were struck during the reign of Stephen I who was crowned the first king of Hungary in 1000 or 1001. His coins were minted after Bavarian patterns.

Notes

Sources 

 
 
 
 
 

Economic history of Hungary